Qualification for the Little League World Series in Mexico, whereby teams based in Mexico compete to select a champion to participate in the Little League World Series (LLWS), has occurred since 2001. In 2001, when the LLWS expanded to 16 teams, the Mexico Region was created as one of eight international regions, resulting in Mexico's Little League champion receiving an automatic berth in the LLWS. Mexico previously competed as part of the Latin America Region, from 1958 to 2001, whereby the champion from Mexico had to compete against teams from other countries in order to secure a berth in the LLWS.

Mexican teams have won three LLWS championships and have been runner-up three times. The country currently has about 450 active leagues, making it the third-largest country in terms of Little League participation.

Mexican championships

Finals
Since 2001, when then Mexico Region was created

Regions

Mexico in the Little League World Series
The table below lists the records of teams from Mexico that have competed in the LLWS in South Williamsport, Pennsylvania. Participation before 2001 was inconsistent (for example, only one appearance during the 1970s), as teams from Mexico had to qualify via the Latin America Region. Since 2001, Mexico receives an automatic berth in the LLWS, with the exception of 2020 (when no LLWS was held) and 2021 (when the LLWS was restricted to teams based in the United States) due to the COVID-19 pandemic. Notably, teams from Mexico have twice represented regions of the United States in the LLWS:

 In , Industrial Little League of Monterrey represented the South Region of the United States. The team defeated Biloxi LL, 13–0, and Owensboro LL, 3–0, in the regional final. Monterrey then defeated teams from Connecticut and California to win the LLWS.
 In , Mexicali Little League of Mexicali represented the West Region of the United States. Because of its proximity to the El Centro/Calexico area in Southern California (the potential players from that region could have played for that city's leagues), Mexicali competed in and represented California's District 22 in the Southern California division and won the West Region tournament. They defeated Green Valley LL, 10–0, Fairbanks LL, 8–0, Raleigh Hills LL, 10–0, and finally Danville LL, 2–0, in the regional final. Mexicali went on to become the United States champion, and was LLWS runner-up to the international champion (National Little League, Kaohsiung, Taiwan). After the 1985 Series, Mexicali Little League was shifted from California leagues to Mexico leagues.

Summary
As of the 2022 Little League World Series.

Notable players
 David Cortés – later played in Major League Baseball (MLB) with Atlanta, Cleveland, and Colorado. ( LLWS)
Héctor Torres – son of Epitacio "La Mala" Torres, and MLB player between 1968 and 1977. ( LLWS)
Carlos "Bobby" Treviño – played in MLB during 1968 with the California Angels, and played 13 season in the Mexican League. ( LLWS)

World champions

1957 Liga Pequeña Industrial
Roster

Angel Macías
Enrique Suárez
Norberto Villarreal
Ricardo Treviño
Baltasar Charles
Rafael Estrello
Gerardo González
José Maiz García
Jesús Contreras
Mario Ontiveros
Alfonso Cortez
Roberto Mendiola
Fidel Ruiz
Francisco Aguilar

Manager
Cesar L. Faz

Coaches
Harold Haskings
José González Torres

1958 Liga Pequeña Industrial

1997 Liga Pequeña Linda Vista
Roster

Rafael Hinojosa Coronado
Everardo Ordoñez Garza
Javier de Isla Villarreal
Adrian Luna Soto
Juan de Dios Garza Zambrano
Ricardo García Alejandro
Alejandro Robles Treviño
Pablo Torres Reyes
René Hinojosa Garza
Alejandro Guajardo Peña
Omar Rios Pérez
Luis Robles Obregón
Daniel Baca Marcos
Gabriel Alvarez Sevilla

Manager
Jaime Luna Gómez

Coaches
José Angel Valadez Guerrero
Julio Garza de la Garza

References

External links
Fundación LLB México (Ligas Pequeñas de Beisbol en México) (Little League Baseball in Mexico) official website 
 LPB Región UNO (Region 1, Little League Baseball in Mexico) official website 

Little League World Series regions
L
L
L
Professional sports leagues in Mexico